"Falling" is a song written and recorded by Canadian singer-songwriter Bruce Guthro. It was released in 1998 as the second single from his second studio album, Of Your Son. The song peaked at number 15 on the RPM Country Tracks and number 12 on the RPM Adult Contemporary Tracks chart. It also peaked at number 39 on the RPM Top Singles chart.

Chart performance

Year-end charts

References

1998 songs
1998 singles
Bruce Guthro songs
EMI Records singles